Polybothris is a genus of beetles in the family Buprestidae, containing the following species:

 Polybothris acripes Guérin, 1925
 Polybothris adspersipennis (Théry, 1905)
 Polybothris aeneicollis (Kerremans, 1911)
 Polybothris aeneomaculata (Klug, 1833)
 Polybothris alboplagiata (Laporte & Gory, 1836)
 Polybothris amorosa Obenberger, 1942
 Polybothris amorpha (Laporte & Gory, 1836)
 Polybothris ampliata (Fairmaire, 1869)
 Polybothris analis (Chevrolat, 1833)
 Polybothris angulicollis (Kerremans, 1911)
 Polybothris angulosa (Théry, 1905)
 Polybothris angusta (Kerremans, 1911)
 Polybothris anniae (Obenberger, 1928)
 Polybothris antiopa Obenberger, 1942
 Polybothris antiqua (Kerremans, 1911)
 Polybothris anulifer (Waterhouse, 1880)
 Polybothris artemis Obenberger, 1942
 Polybothris auberti Théry, 1912
 Polybothris aureopilosa (Guérin-Méneville, 1832)
 Polybothris auriventris (Laporte & Gory, 1837)
 Polybothris auroclavata Coquerel, 1851
 Polybothris aurocyanea (Coquerel, 1848)
 Polybothris auropicta (Laporte & Gory, 1836)
 Polybothris azurea (Kerremans, 1903)
 Polybothris bernieri (Laporte & Gory, 1837)
 Polybothris bilobata Kerremans, 1894
 Polybothris bipustulata Fairmaire, 1903
 Polybothris blairi Théry, 1930
 Polybothris blanchardi (Kerremans, 1911)
 Polybothris blucheaui Fairmaire, 1899
 Polybothris bothripyga (Fairmaire, 1869)
 Polybothris bourgoini (Obenberger, 1928)
 Polybothris bouvieri Théry, 1909
 Polybothris calypso Obenberger, 1942
 Polybothris carinifrons (Kerremans, 1911)
 Polybothris carreti (Kerremans, 1903)
 Polybothris cassandra (Obenberger, 1924)
 Polybothris cassidioides (Guérin-Méneville, 1832)
 Polybothris caudatula (Obenberger, 1917)
 Polybothris chalcochrysea (Klug, 1833)
 Polybothris chalybeopicta Kerremans, 1898
 Polybothris chalybeoventralis (Thomson, 1878)
 Polybothris chloe (Obenberger, 1924)
 Polybothris cicerini (Obenberger, 1928)
 Polybothris circularis (Laporte & Gory, 1837)
 Polybothris circulum (Thomson, 1878)
 Polybothris circumdata (Laporte & Gory, 1836)
 Polybothris coccinella (Laporte & Gory, 1837)
 Polybothris coelestis (Kerremans, 1911)
 Polybothris coeruleipes (Waterhouse, 1880)
 Polybothris coeruleiventris (Kerremans, 1903)
 Polybothris coindardi Fairmaire, 1902
 Polybothris colliciata (Guérin-Méneville, 1832)
 Polybothris complanata (Guérin-Méneville, 1832)
 Polybothris cordiformis (Thomson, 1878)
 Polybothris corinna (Obenberger, 1924)
 Polybothris crassa (Waterhouse, 1880)
 Polybothris cribraria (Waterhouse, 1880)
 Polybothris cribripennis Théry, 1912
 Polybothris cupreonitens Kerremans, 1894
 Polybothris cupreovaria Kerremans, 1894
 Polybothris cuprifera (Laporte & Gory, 1836)
 Polybothris cyanella (Obenberger, 1917)
 Polybothris cyclopyga (Fairmaire, 1889)
 Polybothris darwini Théry, 1912
 Polybothris deyrollei (Thomson, 1878)
 Polybothris diecki Théry, 1905
 Polybothris diffinis Kerremans, 1894
 Polybothris dilatata (Olivier, 1790)
 Polybothris diversicollis (Kerremans, 1911)
 Polybothris dodone Obenberger, 1942
 Polybothris dujardini (Descarpentries, 1974)
 Polybothris elliptica (Waterhouse, 1880)
 Polybothris eros Obenberger, 1942
 Polybothris errata (Théry, 1905)
 Polybothris eubrachea (Obenberger, 1924)
 Polybothris expansicollis (Fairmaire, 1869)
 Polybothris fairmairei Saunders, 1871
 Polybothris faucherei Théry, 1912
 Polybothris flesa (Klug, 1833)
 Polybothris francoiseae Neef de Sainval, 2000
 Polybothris fulgidiventris (Waterhouse, 1880)
 Polybothris geminata (Kerremans, 1911)
 Polybothris goryi (Guérin-Méneville, 1833)
 Polybothris grandidieri (Théry, 1905)
 Polybothris gratiosa (Kerremans, 1911)
 Polybothris gueyraudi Neef de Sainval, 2000
 Polybothris heliobia Obenberger, 1942
 Polybothris heydeni (Théry, 1905)
 Polybothris hova Künckel d'Herculais, 1890
 Polybothris humblotii Fairmaire, 1893
 Polybothris hypocyana Fairmaire, 1901
 Polybothris impressipennis (Laporte & Gory, 1836)
 Polybothris incerticolor (Kerremans, 1911)
 Polybothris inclyta Fairmaire, 1902
 Polybothris indigna Fairmaire, 1899
 Polybothris indistincta (Gory, 1840)
 Polybothris indurata (Obenberger, 1926)
 Polybothris infrasplendens (Thomson, 1878)
 Polybothris inornata (Fairmaire, 1869)
 Polybothris insignis (Kerremans, 1903)
 Polybothris jansonii (Thomson, 1878)
 Polybothris klugii (Laporte & Gory, 1837)
 Polybothris lachesis (Obenberger, 1924)
 Polybothris laeta (Laporte & Gory, 1837)
 Polybothris laeviventris (Waterhouse, 1882)
 Polybothris lafertei (Gory, 1840)
 Polybothris lamina (Klug, 1833)
 Polybothris laportedeana Obenberger, 1942
 Polybothris lateralis (Waterhouse, 1880)
 Polybothris laticollis (Kerremans, 1903)
 Polybothris latissima Meyer-Darcis, 1906
 Polybothris lelieurii Buquet, 1854
 Polybothris lepetitii (Gory, 1840)
 Polybothris linearis (Kerremans, 1911)
 Polybothris luczoti Guérin-Méneville, 1833
 Polybothris luteopicta Kerremans, 1900
 Polybothris maculiventris (Laporte & Gory, 1837)
 Polybothris madoni Théry, 1912
 Polybothris marginalis (Olivier, 1790)
 Polybothris mariae Obenberger, 1942
 Polybothris marmorata (Kerremans, 1911)
 Polybothris melitta Obenberger, 1942
 Polybothris miribella Obenberger, 1942
 Polybothris mocquerysi (Théry, 1905)
 Polybothris moesta (Thomson, 1878)
 Polybothris molesta (Thomson, 1878)
 Polybothris moralesi (Théry, 1905)
 Polybothris mucronata (Laporte & Gory, 1836)
 Polybothris muhlbergi (Kerremans, 1893)
 Polybothris multiguttata (Waterhouse, 1880)
 Polybothris myrmido (Théry, 1905)
 Polybothris mystica (Thomson, 1878)
 Polybothris natalensis Théry, 1930
 Polybothris navicularis (Laporte & Gory, 1836)
 Polybothris nickerli (Obenberger, 1924)
 Polybothris nigra Kerremans, 1898
 Polybothris nitidiventris (Laporte & Gory, 1837)
 Polybothris nivicincta (Fairmaire, 1902)
 Polybothris nivifera (Théry, 1905)
 Polybothris nossibiana (Fairmaire, 1869)
 Polybothris oberthurii (Fairmaire, 1893)
 Polybothris obesa (Kerremans, 1911)
 Polybothris obscura (Thomson, 1878)
 Polybothris obsoleta (Thomson, 1878)
 Polybothris obtusa (Laporte & Gory, 1836)
 Polybothris ochreata (Olivier, 1790)
 Polybothris ogloblini (Obenberger, 1928)
 Polybothris orbicularis (Thomson, 1878)
 Polybothris ovalis (Waterhouse, 1880)
 Polybothris ovularis (Thomson, 1878)
 Polybothris pandora Obenberger, 1942
 Polybothris parallela (Waterhouse, 1880)
 Polybothris parmulata (Fairmaire, 1869)
 Polybothris penelope Obenberger, 1942
 Polybothris perrieri Fairmaire, 1901
 Polybothris petrequini (Théry, 1910)
 Polybothris peyrierasi (Descarpentries, 1974)
 Polybothris pfeifferae Obenberger, 1942
 Polybothris pisciformis (Thomson, 1878)
 Polybothris planula (Obenberger, 1926)
 Polybothris psyche Obenberger, 1942
 Polybothris pulverulenta (Théry, 1905)
 Polybothris pulvifera (Obenberger, 1926)
 Polybothris puncticollis (Thomson, 1878)
 Polybothris punctipennis Kerremans, 1894
 Polybothris punctiventris (Waterhouse, 1880)
 Polybothris pygidialis Fairmaire, 1904
 Polybothris pyrogastra Fairmaire, 1903
 Polybothris pyropyga Coquerel, 1851
 Polybothris quadricollis (Laporte & Gory, 1836)
 Polybothris quadrimaculata (Waterhouse, 1882)
 Polybothris quadripunctata (Kerremans, 1911)
 Polybothris quadrispilota (Laporte & Gory, 1836)
 Polybothris ranavalona (Obenberger, 1928)
 Polybothris regalis Théry, 1912
 Polybothris renardi Théry, 1912
 Polybothris republicana (Théry, 1905)
 Polybothris rotundata (Guérin-Méneville, 1832)
 Polybothris rubidipes (Théry, 1905)
 Polybothris ruficauda (Thomson, 1878)
 Polybothris rustica (Théry, 1905)
 Polybothris salvazai (Obenberger, 1924)
 Polybothris sanguineotincta Obenberger, 1942
 Polybothris scapularis (Guérin-Méneville, 1832)
 Polybothris scenica (Gory, 1840)
 Polybothris sexmaculata (Laporte & Gory, 1836)
 Polybothris silphoides (Thomson, 1878)
 Polybothris sobrina (Waterhouse, 1882)
 Polybothris sodalis (Waterhouse, 1880)
 Polybothris solea (Klug, 1833)
 Polybothris sparsuta (Laporte & Gory, 1837)
 Polybothris specialis (Obenberger, 1924)
 Polybothris spesivcevi (Obenberger, 1928)
 Polybothris splendidiventris (Laporte & Gory, 1837)
 Polybothris squalus (Thomson, 1878)
 Polybothris staudingeri Théry, 1912
 Polybothris strigithorax (Obenberger, 1928)
 Polybothris stygia Obenberger, 1942
 Polybothris suarezina (Obenberger, 1924)
 Polybothris subelongata (Thomson, 1878)
 Polybothris subpropinqua Théry, 1912
 Polybothris subsilphoides (Thomson, 1878)
 Polybothris sulcicollis (Kerremans, 1903)
 Polybothris sumptuosa (Klug, 1833)
 Polybothris surcoufi Théry, 1912
 Polybothris tacens (Obenberger, 1917)
 Polybothris tananarivensis (Obenberger, 1928)
 Polybothris terminalis (Waterhouse, 1880)
 Polybothris tetraleuca Fairmaire, 1901
 Polybothris theryi Meyer-Darcis, 1906
 Polybothris thyris Obenberger, 1942
 Polybothris transversa Fairmaire, 1902
 Polybothris truncatella (Waterhouse, 1880)
 Polybothris truncatipennis (Fairmaire, 1889)
 Polybothris vacheri (Théry, 1909)
 Polybothris vermiculata (Kerremans, 1911)
 Polybothris videns (Thomson, 1878)
 Polybothris villettei Théry, 1926
 Polybothris violaceiventris (Kerremans, 1911)
 Polybothris viridichalybea (Thomson, 1878)
 Polybothris wautersi (Théry, 1905)
 Polybothris zoufali (Obenberger, 1928)

References

 
Buprestidae genera